Arthur Samuel Turner (1867 – after 1890) was an English footballer who played in the Football Alliance for Small Heath. Born in Birmingham, Turner joined Small Heath after he was released by Aston Villa without playing for their first team. An inside right, he played one game in Small Heath's second season in the Football Alliance, deputising for Charlie Short in a 4–3 defeat at home to Darwen in November 1890. He was not retained at the end of the 1890–91 season.

References

1867 births
Year of death missing
Footballers from Birmingham, West Midlands
English footballers
Association football forwards
Aston Villa F.C. players
Birmingham City F.C. players
Date of birth missing
Place of death missing
Football Alliance players